Bernhard Lund (16 April 1910 – 27 June 1969) was a Norwegian footballer. He played in three matches for the Norway national football team from 1933 to 1934.

References

External links
 

1910 births
1969 deaths
Norwegian footballers
Norway international footballers
Place of birth missing
Association footballers not categorized by position